Bohdan Riabets (born 1 November 1991) is a Ukrainian footballer who plays as a forward.

Playing career 
Riabets played in the Ukrainian First League in 2017-18 with FC Avanhard Kramatorsk, where he appeared in six matches. In 2018, he played abroad in the Canadian Soccer League with FC Vorkuta, where he won the CSL Championship.

References 

1991 births
Living people
Ukrainian footballers
FC Kramatorsk players
FC Continentals players
Ukrainian First League players
Canadian Soccer League (1998–present) players
Association football forwards
Ukrainian expatriate footballers
Ukrainian expatriate sportspeople in Canada
Expatriate soccer players in Canada